
Gmina Grudusk is a rural gmina (administrative district) in Ciechanów County, Masovian Voivodeship, in east-central Poland.

Villages
Gmina Grudusk contains the villages and settlements of:

Neighbouring gminas
Gmina Grudusk is bordered by the gminas of Czernice Borowe, Dzierzgowo, Regimin, Stupsk and Szydłowo.

References

External links 
Archived official website

Grudusk
Ciechanów County